William Avery Cochrane (1842–1929) was a member of the Wisconsin State Assembly.

Biography
Cochrane was born on January 8, 1842, in Ripley, New York. During the American Civil War, he served with the 40th Wisconsin Volunteer Infantry Regiment of the Union Army. In 1867, he graduated from Beloit College and became a teacher at the Wisconsin School for the Deaf. Cochrane died in August 1929.

Political career
Cochrane was elected to the Assembly in 1892. Additionally, he was an alderman and a member of the school board of Delavan, Wisconsin. He was a Republican.

References

People from Ripley, New York
People from Delavan, Wisconsin
Republican Party members of the Wisconsin State Assembly
Wisconsin city council members
School board members in Wisconsin
Beloit College alumni
People of Wisconsin in the American Civil War
Union Army soldiers
Schoolteachers from Wisconsin
1842 births
1929 deaths
Educators from New York (state)